The Evacuee Trust Property Board, a statutory board of the Government of Pakistan, is a key government department which administers evacuee properties, including educational, charitable or religious trusts left behind by Hindus and Sikhs who migrated to India after partition. It also maintains places of worship belonging to Hindus and Sikhs in Pakistan.

Members
The board has 6 official and 18 non-official members. In 2020, six of the official members are Muslims and of the total of the 18 non-official members, only eight are from the minority Hindu and Sikh communities.

Background
The Evacuee Trust Property Board was established in 1960 to look after the temples and land left over by Sikhs and Hindus who migrated to India during partition in 1947 and 1948. The board functions under the Act (Management & Disposal) No. XIII of 1975. The board was started as a result of Nehru-Liaqat Pact in 1950 and Pant Mirza Agreement in 1955 to guarantee the rights of the minority Hindus and Sikhs.

Properties

There are over 1,130 Hindu temples and 517 gurdwaras in Pakistan.
The board controls and manages 109,404 acres of agricultural land and 46,499 acres of built-up urban sub-units in accordance with “Scheme for the Lease of Evacuee Trust Agricultural Land, 1975” and “Schemes for the Management and Disposal of Urban Evacuee Trust Properties, 1977. (Evacuee Trust Properties essentially are the properties attached to charitable, religious or educational trust or institutions.)

Healthcare
The board runs the Janki Devi Jamiat Singh Hospital and seven health centers.

Educational Institutes
The following educational institutions are functioning and imparting free education to minorities:
 Hazrat Ayesha Sadiqa Degree College Lahore
 Dr. Mateen Fatima Trust model School
 Trust Model Public High School

Corruption
In December 2017, during the hearing of a case on Katas Raj Temple in Chakwal, the Chief Justice of Pakistan, Mian Saqib Nisar, expressed displeasure at the absence or displacing of idols from the temples, demanding to know why there were no statues in the temples of Shiri Ram and Hanuman. The bench was told that Asif Hashmi, a former chairman  of Evacuee Trust Property Board, earned millions of rupees from corruption [during his tenure] and then left [Pakistan]. The chairman of the board, at that time, Mr. Saddique, also highlighted his "fight against corruption" [within the board] in his message on the board's website.

Criticism

No minority representation
The ETP board is often criticised for not having enough Hindu and Sikhs members on the board. During the signing of Liaqat-Nehru pact, both Pakistan and India agreed to appoint a Muslim head in India and a Hindu head in Pakistan to look after evacuee property. However, since independence, the Pakistan government never appointed a Hindu citizen as chairman. In 2020, all six official members are Muslims and of the 18 non-official members, only eight are from the minority Hindu and Sikh communities. In 2018, Ramesh Kumar Vankwani, Hindu member of the national assembly, presented the Evacuee Trust Properties (Management and Disposal) Bill 2018 which says that only a Hindu or Sikh should be appointed as the chairperson of the Evacuee Trust Property Board. However, the bill was rejected by the assembly’s standing committee on religious affairs in 2019.

Leasing Hindu Temples
The Evacuee Trust Property Board has been criticised for leasing sacred Hindu temples to land grabbers. The board rented out the historic Kali Bari Hindu Temple to a Muslim party in Dera Ismail Khan in 2014. This historic temple is being converted and used as the Taj Mahal Hotel. Frontier Constabulary officials, with the help of the board, have occupied the Shamshan Ghaat in Dera Ismail Khan and the Hindu community is unable to cremate their dead because of the unavailability of Shamshan Ghaat and is forced to bury them in a graveyard shared by members of other faiths.

External links 
 
1500 years of our history: Enter the Katas Raj temples on Dawn newspaper

See also

References

Pakistan federal departments and agencies
History of Pakistan
Partition of India